Osolo Township is one of sixteen townships in Elkhart County, Indiana. As of the 2010 census, its population was 28,032.

History
Osolo Township was organized in 1838.

Geography

Cities and towns
 Elkhart (north quarter)
 Simonton Lake

Unincorporated towns
 East Lake Estates
 Garden Village
 Greenleaf Manor
(This list is based on USGS data and may include former settlements.)

Major highways

References
 United States Census Bureau cartographic boundary files
 U.S. Board on Geographic Names

External links
 Indiana Township Association
 United Township Association of Indiana

Townships in Elkhart County, Indiana
Townships in Indiana